Snake Bay Airport  is located at Milikapiti, Northern Territory on the northern coast of Melville Island, Australia.

History

World War II
The Royal Australian Air Force (RAAF) built the airfield as a forward fighter aerodrome, during World War II as part of the proposed strategic amphibious operations by Allied forces against the Tanimbar Islands and Kai Islands. It was proposed to accommodate a RAAF Fighter Wing and a United States Army Air Forces Fighter Group.

Construction was started on 7 July 1944, by No. 9 Mobile Works Unit RAAF with the help of 40 Aborigines. The airfield was operational on 30 August 1944.

The airfield was never fully utilized as the proposed amphibious operations were canceled and replaced with the New Guinea campaign. The airfield was known as Austin Strip and RAAF Melville Island.

Units based at Austin Strip
No. 6 Communications Unit RAAF
No. 9 Mobile Works Unit RAAF

Airlines and destinations

See also
 List of airports in the Northern Territory

References

External links
 

Airports in the Northern Territory
Former Royal Australian Air Force bases
1944 establishments in Australia
Airports established in 1944
Airfields of the United States Army Air Forces in Australia
World War II airfields in Australia